Information Processing and Management is a bimonthly peer-reviewed academic journal published by Elsevier covering the field of information and computational sciences applied to management. The journal was established in 1963 as Information Storage and Retrieval, obtaining its current name in 1975.

Editors-in-chief
The following persons are or have been editors-in-chief:
2016–present: Jim Jansen (Qatar Computing Research Institute)
2008–2015: Fabio Crestani, (University of Lugano)
1985–2008: Tefko Saracevic (Rutgers University)
1969–1985: Bernard Fry (Indiana University)
1963–1969: Jason Farradane (City, University of London)

Abstracting and indexing
The journal is abstracted and indexed in:
EBSCO databases
FRANCIS
Inspec
Modern Language Association Database
ProQuest databases
Science Citation Index Expanded
Scopus
Social Sciences Citation Index
Zentralblatt MATH
According to the Journal Citation Reports, the journal has a 2020 impact factor of 6.222.

References

External links

Publications established in 1963
Elsevier academic journals
Bimonthly journals
English-language journals
Business and management journals
Information science journals